Rock Creek, West Virginia may refer to:

Rock Creek, Boone County, West Virginia, an unincorporated community
Rock Creek, Raleigh County, West Virginia, an unincorporated community